Braveheart – Original Motion Picture Soundtrack is the instrumental soundtrack album to the 1995 film of the same name composed and conducted by James Horner and performed by the London Symphony Orchestra. It is Horner's second of three collaborations with Mel Gibson as director following The Man Without a Face (1993). The soundtrack, comprising 77 minutes of film score, was notably successful and was nominated for Best Original Score at the 68th Academy Awards in 1996, but lost to Luis Bacalov's composition to Il Postino.

Horner's score includes a melody that appeared again in his 1997 music for Titanic. Irish band Clannad wrote a theme tune for the film, entitled 'Croí Cróga' (meaning 'braveheart'). However, the track was not used in the soundtrack, but was released by Clannad on the album 'Lore'. Several critics have noted similarities between the "Main Theme" and an earlier theme song, Kaoru Wada's "Pai Longing" in the 1991 anime series 3×3 Eyes.

Track listing

Charts

Weekly charts

Year-end charts

Certifications

More Music from Braveheart (1997)
In 1997, album co-producer Simon Rhodes produced a follow-up soundtrack entitled More Music from Braveheart. This album features many unreleased cues, source music, and dialogue from the film.

Previously unreleased

Limited Edition
In November 2015, in commemoration for the film's 20th anniversary, La-La Land Records produced a 2-disc limited edition album of James Horner's complete score to Braveheart. The CD is dedicated to Horner who was killed in a plane accident prior to the album's release.

+: Contains previously unreleased material*: Previously unreleased

References

1995 soundtrack albums
Decca Records soundtracks
James Horner albums